Paul Coe (born 4 February 1949), a Wiradjuri man born at Erambie Mission in Cowra, is an Australian Aboriginal activist. He is known for his advocacy of Aboriginal rights, with involvement in the publicity drive for the 1967 referendum, and the establishment of the Aboriginal Tent Embassy in 1972.

Early life
Paul Coe was born on 4 February 1949 at Erambie Mission, near Cowra in New South Wales. He is a Wiradjuri man His grandfather was Paul Joseph Coe.

Coe was the first Aboriginal scholar at Cowra High School to pass the Higher School Certificate and to be elected a prefect, after spending three years at high school on a scholarship provided by a group of women's organisations.

Career
Coe was active in campaigns around the 1967 referendum as well as the establishment in 1972 of the Aboriginal Tent Embassy, working with Pearl Gibbs, Chicka Dixon and Billy Craigie in the fight for basic human rights and justice for Aboriginal and Torres Strait Islander people. In 1979, Coe, along with Lyall Munro Jnr and Cecil Patten, representing the NSW Organisation for Aboriginal Unity, camped outside Parliament House with an Aboriginal bill of rights that they wished to see established by the  federal government.

Coe and a group of other activists including Isabel Coe, Gary Williams, Gary Foley and Tony Coorey also founded the Aboriginal Legal Service in 1970, the first free legal assistance service in Australia. He continued to play an important role in this organisation until the late 1990s.

In 1979, Coe commenced an unsuccessful action in the High Court of Australia arguing that rights of Aboriginal people as prior inhabitants of Australia before European colonisation should be recognised.

Disbarment
In 1997, following proceedings in the Legal Services Tribunal, Paul Coe's name was removed from the roll of legal practitioners. The Tribunal found that Coe had sworn an affidavit which he knew to be false in a material particular.  The affidavit in question was sworn in the course of family law proceedings, to which Coe was a party, and understated his salary by some $80,000.

Coe appealed the decision, but the Supreme Court of New South Wales Court of Appeal upheld the Tribunal's decision.

Both the Tribunal and the Court of Appeal commended Coe's role in advancing the interests of the Aboriginal community; however, the Court considered that Coe was not fit to practise, stating that the Court must be able to trust that barristers appearing before it would act in accordance with the law and would not mislead the Court.

Media reports in 2003 indicated that Coe was subsequently investigated by the Bar Association of NSW for continuing to practise despite being removed from the roll.  The outcome of the investigation is unknown.

References

External links

 Paul Coe was 14 in 1963, son of L. J. Coe of Erambie Station.

 commenting on Paul Coe's epitaph
National Library of Australia catalogue entry - biographical cuttings

Living people
1949 births
Australian indigenous rights activists
20th-century Australian lawyers
Wiradjuri people
Disbarred lawyers